Ten Benny, also known as Nothing to Lose, is a 1995 film directed by Eric Bross and starring Adrien Brody. It currently has a 44% on Rotten Tomatoes based on 9 reviews.

References

External links

1995 drama films
1995 directorial debut films
1995 films
American drama films
Films directed by Eric Bross
1990s English-language films
1990s American films